HM Prison Shrewsbury was a Category B/C men's prison in Shrewsbury, Shropshire, England. It was decommissioned in March 2013, and is now open to the public.

The Victorian prison as seen today sits on top of the original Georgian prison, the remains of which are still accessible underneath the current buildings. The former prison site, on Howard Street, adjacent to Shrewsbury railway station, is near the site of the Dana Gaol, a medieval prison. The name The Dana is still often used for the prison, as well as being the name of the road to one side of the prison and the pedestrian route that runs from near the front of the prison into the town centre via a footbridge over the station.

Shrewsbury Prison is now open to the public as an interactive tourism destination, The Campbell Group runs guided tours, ghost tours and various activities throughout the 4 acre-site. The prison will continue to operate as a tourism destination and there are now no plans for re-development.

History
There has been a prison on the site since 1793, the original building being constructed by Thomas Telford to plans by Shrewsbury architect John Hiram Haycock; the present prison building was constructed in 1877. The prison took female convicts until 1922.

For 20 years, Samuel Webster Allen was the Roman Catholic chaplain at the prison before being made the Bishop of Shrewsbury in 1897. Former Wales Rugby Union international player John Strand-Jones was the part-time Church of England chaplain from 1930 to 1934.

Between 1902 and 1961 the following seven people were executed by hanging within the walls of HMP Shrewsbury for the crime of murder:-

 Richard Wigley, aged 34 years, on Tuesday, 18 March 1902, for the murder of his girlfriend Mary Ellen Bowen.
 William Griffiths, aged 57 years, on Tuesday, 24 July 1923, for the murder of his mother Catherine Hughes.
 Frank Griffin, aged 40 years, on Thursday, 4 January 1951, for the murder of Jane Edge.
 Harry Huxley, aged 43 years, on Tuesday, 8 July 1952, for the murder of his girlfriend Ada Royce.
 Donald Neil Simon, aged 32 years, on Thursday, 23 October 1952, for the murders of his estranged wife Eunice Simon and her lover Victor Brades.
 Desmond Donald Hooper, aged 27 years, on Tuesday, 26 January 1954, for the murder of Betty Smith
 George Riley aged 21 years on Thursday, 9 February 1961, for the murder of his neighbour Adeline Mary Smith.

The names of their victims and their relationships with them appear also. In almost every case the murder victim was female. Executions took place at 8.00 am. All executed prisoners were buried in unmarked graves inside the prison, as was customary. The four executions which took place during the 1950s were all conducted by Albert Pierrepoint and his assistant. The last execution in 1961 was conducted by Harry Allen and his assistant. In February 2014 the Ministry of Justice stated that the remains of ten executed prisoners were exhumed from the prison in 1972, with nine cremated at a local crematorium and the ashes scattered there. The remaining body was handed over to relatives.

In September 2004, Member of Parliament George Stevenson, called for an enquiry into the number of suicides which had occurred at Shrewsbury Prison. This came after three inmates had hanged themselves at the jail in two weeks.

A report in 2005 named Shrewsbury prison as the most overcrowded in England and Wales. In August 2008 a further report stated that the prison had 178 places in use but held 326 inmates - an overcrowding rate of 183%.  A report in June 2012 by the Prison Reform Trust awarded Shrewsbury second place in England and Wales for overcrowding, holding 326 prisoners in space designed for 170 men, a figure exceeded only by HM Prison Kennet in Liverpool at the time.  In 1934, the prison had contained the larger number of 204 cells.

A bust of prison reformer John Howard is above the main entrance to the prison. The street leading up to the prison from the main road is also named after him.

Before closure, Shrewsbury was a Category B/C prison accepting adult males from the local courts in its catchment area. Accommodation at the prison consisted of double occupancy cells in mostly Victorian buildings. The prison offered education and workshops to inmates. A Listener Scheme was also available to prisoners at risk of suicide or self-harm.

In January 2013, it was announced that the prison was scheduled for closure. The last inmates were transferred from Shrewsbury to other prisons on 27 February 2013, ahead of its closure in March.

The Grade II listed former prison building was sold by the Ministry of Justice to developers, the Trevor Osborne Property Group, in 2014, and is expected to be converted into homes and offices. In April 2015, it was revealed proposals included accommodation for around 200 students of the recently created University Centre Shrewsbury. In January 2016 formal planning proposals to convert the former prison to flats and student accommodation were submitted but in December 2016 Shropshire Council refused the outline plans, also including restaurants, shops and a gym, on grounds of effects on traffic.

In September 2020 the prison was purchased by The Campbell Group, who have operated the site for the past five years. This purchase will see the prison continue to operate as an interactive tourism destination, with further development and investment planned to create a World renowned attraction.

Cultural impact

Poetry
The prison is mentioned in "On Moonlit Heath and Lonesome Bank" which is part of the poem, "A Shropshire Lad" by A.E. Housman. The proximity of the prison to Shrewsbury railway station and junction is highlighted in the verse:

They hang us now in Shrewsbury jail:
The whistles blow forlorn,
And trains all night groan on the rail
To men that die at morn.

Film location

Since its closure, in September 2015 it was reported the buildings would be used as a setting for the Sky 1 television drama, Lucky Man (producer, Carnival Films) being cast as the fictional "Whitecross Prison". Filming would take place there for a week.

Shrewsbury Prison was used as the filming location of the prison for series 2 of the ITV drama series Prey.

In 2016, Shrewsbury Prison was featured on a season 2 episode of Paranormal Lockdown as a haunted location. It also appeared in three Most Haunted episodes at the end of August and in early September. This was followed by a two-hour long Halloween special of Most Haunted As Live! released on 31 October on UKTV Play and shown on 3 November on Really.

In 2018, the prison was used for the location of Prince Charles' prison cell for the Sky One film, The Queen and I.

In 2019, the prison was used for episodes of Coronation Street featuring Jack P. Shepherd

In 2020, the prison features in the final episode of ITV's Bancroft when DCI Elizabeth Bancroft is sent down at the end of the episode.

In 2020, the prison was used for scenes in the TV drama Time, starring Sean Bean and Stephen Graham.

In 2021, the prison was used for scenes in the TV drama Without Sin starring Vicky McClure

Notable prisoners
Lee Davies was a corrections officer, who worked at HMP Lancaster Farms. He used to smuggle mobile phones and drugs into that prison, and was caught one day as he was at work. He served a few months in jail at HMP Shrewsbury in 2012. He now works as an electrician.

George Riley. Executed by hanging in Shrewsbury prison February 1961

References

External links

Official website for Shrewsbury Prison 
Ministry of Justice pages on Shrewsbury
On moonlit heath and lonesome bank

1793 establishments in England
2013 disestablishments in England
Government buildings completed in 1877
Buildings and structures in Shrewsbury
Prisons in Shropshire
Grade II listed buildings in Shropshire
Grade II listed prison buildings
Men's prisons
Defunct prisons in England